Tsering Dolma (1919 - 21 November 1964) was the founder of the non-profit refugee organisation Tibetan Children's Villages and is the older sister of the 14th Dalai Lama, Tenzing Gyatso.

Biography 
Tsering Dolma was the eldest daughter of a farming and horse trading family living in the hamlet of Taktser. She was the eldest sister of the 14th Dalai Lama, and acted as a midwife to her mother during his birth in 1935 at the age of 16.

She married Phunstock Tashi Takla, a Tibetan politician in 1937 and they moved to Lhasa in 1940. She was part of the 1950 Tibetan delegation to India who met with Jawaharlal Nehru, and she also formed part of a 1954 delegation to Beijing to meet with Mao Zedong and the National People's Congress.

She fled Tibet to India in response to the 1959 Tibetan uprising alongside her brother and other prominent Tibetans with he support of the Central Intelligence Agency's Special Activities Center.

In exile she established Tibetan Children's Villages who assisted in the building and running of refugee camps for children in Dharamshala. There, she also worked with international volunteers from Service Civil International.

Tsering Dolma died in England in 1964.

References 

Tibetan politicians
1919 births
1964 deaths
Chinese emigrants to India